Lost (also called Tears for Simon) is a 1956 British thriller film directed by Guy Green and starring David Farrar, David Knight and Julia Arnall. It is set in 1950s London, and revolves around the apparent kidnapping of a young couple's baby.

Plot
US embassy employee Lee Cochrane and his Austrian wife discover their 18-month-old son Simon has been abducted, after their nanny leaves the child unattended outside a chemist's shop. London Detective Inspector Craig pledges to find the child, though clues are thin on the ground.

Cast
 David Farrar as Detective Inspector Craig 
 David Knight as Lee Cochrane 
 Julia Arnall as Sue Cochrane 
 Anthony Oliver as Sergeant Lyel 
 Thora Hird as Kelly's landlady 
 Eleanor Summerfield as Sergeant Cook 
 Anne Paige as Nanny 
 Marjorie Rhodes as Mrs. Jeffries 
 Anna Turner as Alma Robey 
 Everley Gregg as Viscountess 
 Meredith Edwards as Sergeant Davies
 Anita Sharp-Bolster as Miss Gill (billed as Anita Bolster)
 Beverly Brooks as Pam (telephone operator) - uncredited
Joan Hickson as shop assistant in chemist's shop.
Joan Sims as ice cream seller.
Barbara Windsor as girl in chemist's shop (uncredited).
Shirley Anne Field as Miss Carter, daughter of garage/taxi service proprietor (uncredited).
George Woodbridge as Mr. Carter, garage proprietor (uncredited).
Dandy Nichols as greengrocer's shop assistant.
Alma Taylor as Mrs. Bellamy (uncredited)
Mona Washbourne as Library Manageress (uncredited)
John Welsh (actor) Police Scientist (uncredited)

Critical reception
Allmovie wrote, "This nail-biting film is filled to capacity with many of Britain's top supporting players, including Thora Hird, Everley Gregg, Joan Sims, Shirley Anne Field, Joan Hickson, Dandy Nichols, Mona Washbourne, Barbara Windsor and George Woodbridge"; and the Radio Times wrote, "this film succeeds because it confronts every parent's nightmare: what happens when you suddenly look away and find your child is missing when you look back? Of course, this being a class-riddled Rank picture, it's the nanny who loses the baby, but it's pretty harrowing nonetheless, despite the casting of insipid David Knight and Julia Arnall as baby Simon's parents. Granite-faced cop David Farrar is on hand to bring grit to screenwriter Janet Green's earnest chase movie, and not-so-hidden among the red herrings are a welter of British character players, with particularly impressive work from Thora Hird. The little-known Anna Turner also gives a fine performance as the tormented baby-snatcher, and Harry Waxman's colour location photography is superb, but the cliff-top climax is a little hard to believe."

References

External links
 
 

1956 films
British mystery films
British detective films
1950s English-language films
Films about child abduction
Films directed by Guy Green
Films scored by Benjamin Frankel
Films shot at Pinewood Studios
Films set in London
1950s British films
British thriller films
1950s thriller films